Iosif Bergesz (born 14 September 1921, date of death unknown) was a Romanian rower. He competed in the men's eight event at the 1952 Summer Olympics.

References

1921 births
Year of death missing
Romanian male rowers
Olympic rowers of Romania
Rowers at the 1952 Summer Olympics
Sportspeople from Arad, Romania